Valentin Atanassov Ganev (born April 7, 1956) is a Bulgarian theatre and film actor and theatre director.

Career
Born in Ruse, Bulgaria, Ganev graduated from the All Russian State Institute for Cinematography, Moscow (actor's classes of Sergey Bondarchuk). He is known for his work on East/West (Est-Ouest) (1999), Icon (2005), Hushove (2006), The Abandoned (2006), The Prince & Me 3: A Royal Honeymoon (2008), The Way Back (2010), J'étais à Nüremberg (2010) etc. Quite active on stage. Since 1996 he has been an actor at The National Theatre of Bulgaria.

Filmography

References

External links
 

Bulgarian male film actors
1956 births
Living people
People from Ruse, Bulgaria